Penton is an English surname, which combines the Celtic word Pen meaning 'a hill'  and the Old English word tun meaning 'a town or settlement'. It is a toponymic surname for any of several places in England named Penton. This surname may refer to:

Arthur Pole Penton (1854–1920), British major general in the Royal Artillery 
Aurelia Pentón (born 1941), Cuban athlete
Baven Penton (1890–?), English professional footballer
Brian Penton (1904–1951), Australian journalist and novelist
Frederick Thomas Penton (1851–1929), British army officer and politician 
James Penton, Canadian historian
John Penton, American football coach
Henry Penton (disambiguation)
Richard Howard Penton (1882–1960), English marine and landscape painter
John Penton, American Enduro motorcycle pioneer